Kelly (Mogk) Larson was the first woman to complete Coast Guard Rescue Swimmer School in the United States on May 23, 1986. She had joined the Coast Guard two years earlier, in 1984. She earned an Air Medal in 1989 for rescuing a downed Air National Guard F-4 pilot. In 2009, she retired with the rank of lieutenant commander. She was inducted into the Women in Aviation International Pioneer Hall of Fame in 2019.

References 

20th-century births
Year of birth missing (living people)
Living people